Villagorgia is a genus of gorgonian-type octocorals in the family Plexauridae.

Species
The World Register of Marine Species lists these species:

References

Plexauridae
Octocorallia genera